Ernest Patili Assi (December 1936 – 16 February 1996), was the first bishop of the Roman Catholic Diocese of Kara, Togo. Ordained to the priesthood on 28 June 1964, he was ordained bishop of the newly created diocese on 15 October 1994 but died only 18 months later.

He was born in the canton of Bohou and spoke Kabiye and French.

References

1936 births
1996 deaths
Togolese Roman Catholic bishops
Roman Catholic bishops of Kara